Agromyza nana is a species of fly in the family Agromyzidae. It is found in the Palearctic. Description of imago-Interocular space red. Antennomeres 1 and  II red. Peristoma and palps black. Dorsocentral bristles : 1 +3 subequal; acrostics in four rows. Legs black, knees red. Abdomen black with lighter pruinosity than the thorax. Long.:1,75-2,5 mm.  The larva mines  Trifolium pratense, Melilotus altissima, Medicago.

References

External links
Images representing  Agromyza nana at BOLD
Leaf miners

Agromyzidae
Insects described in 1830
Muscomorph flies of Europe